Xavier Gonzalez (1898–1993) was an American artist. He was born in Almeria, Spain. He lived in Argentina and Mexico for some time, and was planning on becoming an engineer in a gold mine. In 1925, he immigrated to the United States.

Education
Gonzalez began his studies at the Art Institute of Chicago from 1921 to 1923, and his uncle, José Arpa, studied with him there. He also studied at the San Carlos Academy in Mexico City, as well as in Paris and in the Far East. In 1931, Gonzalez became a US citizen, and in 1935, he married fellow artist Ethel Edwards (1914–1999), who was seventeen years his junior and also his student at Newcomb College. He often worked and studied with fellow artist Julius Woeltz, who was the best man at his wedding. Gonzales commandeered the canteen wall at Newcomb for the use of his art students.

Works
Gonzalez's works have been displayed throughout the United States, at the Corcoran Gallery of Art, the Whitney Museum of American Art, the Metropolitan Museum of Art. He was also well known in Paris, Venice, Brussels and Tokyo. He taught art at Tulane University, the Brooklyn Museum, Case Western Reserve University, and the Newcomb Memorial School of Art, and was the director of the art school at Sul Ross State Teachers College in Alpine, Texas. In 1953, he was elected to the National Academy of Design as an Associate member, then became a full Academician in 1955. He illustrated a children's book called "He Who Saw Everything, The Epic of Gilgamesh" by Anita Feagles (1966).

Gonzalez died of leukemia in 1993, at the age of 94, at Calvary Hospital in the Bronx, New York City.

Murals
Covington, Louisiana,  Tung Oil Industry,  1939, oil on canvas
Hammond, Louisiana, Strawberry Farming, 1937, oil on canvas
Huntsville, Alabama, Tennessee Valley Authority,  Federal Courthouse, oil on canvas
Kilgore, Texas, Pioneer Saga, 1941,  oil on canvas
 Kilgore, Texas, Drilling for Oil, 1941, oil on canvas
 Kilgore, Texas, Music of Plains, 1941. oil on canvas
 Kilgore, Texas, Contemporary Youth, 1941. oil on canvas

His wife, Ethel Edwards painted 2 murals; one titled Life on the Lake in 1942 at the Lake Providence, Louisiana post office  and the other, titled Afternoon on a Texas Ranch, completed in 1941 at the Lampasas, Texas post office.

References

External links

AskART
artnet
United States Bureau of Reclamation
NYtimes.com

1898 births
1993 deaths
20th-century American painters
American male painters
Spanish emigrants to the United States
People from Almería
School of the Art Institute of Chicago alumni
Tulane University faculty
Case Western Reserve University faculty
Sul Ross State University faculty
Deaths from leukemia
Deaths from cancer in New York (state)
20th-century American male artists
Spanish expatriates in Argentina
Spanish expatriates in Mexico
Section of Painting and Sculpture artists